The University of the Arts Singapore (UAS); (Standard Chinese: 新加坡艺术大学;) is a publicly-funded private Collegiate university in Singapore. 
It is a federation of two local arts colleges: Nanyang Academy of Fine Arts, and LASALLE College of the Arts. It was announced as a planned-university in 2021, and took its present name in 2022. The University of the Arts Singapore (UAS) will start receiving applications in the third quarter of 2023, said the Ministry of Education (Singapore), and the two Art Colleges in a joint statement. UAS university's centre will operate out of the National Design Centre in Middle Road, which is in close proximity to the two other institutions.

UAS will be the seventh local university of Singapore, and also will be the only publicly-funded private university other than the now defunct and restructured UniSIM in Singapore. UAS will have its own degree-conferring power in Singapore.

Programmes 
UAS will offer an expanded range of programme offerings in fine arts, design, media arts, performing arts and arts management, as well as in new and upcoming areas in the applied arts. UAS will release further details on the list of courses next year, ahead of its application window in 3Q 2023, for its first intake in 2024. The university will offer undergraduate and postgraduate programmes, with degrees awarded by UAS. 

UAS will also provide the opportunity for larger scale collaborations, such as with world-class arts practitioners and researchers. Other collaborations, such as exchange programmes and joint projects will continue. Students at both institutions will receive degrees from UAS displaying credits along the lines of UAS-NAFA or UAS-Lasalle. Singaporeans will continue to receive government-subsidises for diplomas and degrees on-par with other Singaporean Autonomous University. UAS will generate new artistic thinking and discourse by creatively combining teaching, practice, and research. Collaborating with arts communities and industry partners locally and internationally.

References 

Universities in Singapore
Arts organizations established in the 2020s